Little Angels were an English hard rock band predominantly active between the mid-1980s and mid-1990s. The band reformed on 8 June 2012 to play the Download Festival.

History

1984–1994: Early history and UK popularity
Little Angels formed in Scarborough, England in May 1984, under the name of Zeus and then to Mr Thrud in September 1985, settling on Little Angels during recording of the Too Posh to Mosh mini-album at Fairview Studios, Willerby, Hull in 1987. The founding members were Toby Jepson (vocalist), Mark Plunkett (bassist), Dave Hopper (drummer) and the brothers Bruce John and Jimmy Dickinson (guitarist and keyboardist respectively). Michael Lee joined the band to replace Hopper on 16 August 1988.

It was at this time that the band met Kevin Nixon who became their manager and label boss when he signed them to his York-based company Powerstation Records. Eventually out-growing the local scene the band signed to Polydor Records on 19 May 1988, allegedly a deal done backstage at the old Marquee Club on Charing Cross Road, London.

In 1991, the band released the album Young Gods that Q Magazine called "finely produced and well-arranged" while the single "Boneyard" charted in the UK. Lee was sacked from Little Angels during the Young Gods tour in New York, after it was discovered he had auditioned for The Cult behind their backs. He went on to play the full Ceremony world tour. Lee was replaced by Mark Richardson, who filled in for him on several tour dates, before taking his place officially during the recording of the band's third album, Jam.

"The Big Bad Horns" ("Big" Dave Kemp on saxophone, Frank Mizen on trombone and Grant Kirkhope on trumpet) had become synonymous with the 'Angels'  sound over the years, contributing to a large majority of their recorded output, and appearing live with the band more often than not. However, they were keen to remain independent from the band, so appearances on stage and record are credited to Little Angels and The Big Bad Horns.

Little Angels were successful in the UK with four best selling albums, including a number 1 in the UK Albums Chart in 1993 with Jam, plus 11 hit singles. They enjoyed a high profile in the UK, supporting Van Halen and Bon Jovi, amongst others. In an act of generosity Van Halen gave the band their entire backline for free at the end of the UK tour.

Despite the seemingly disappointing record sales, they followed the announcement of their split by playing a sold-out six date UK tour, culminating in a performance at the Royal Albert Hall in 1994.

1995–2011: After the break-up

After the demise of Little Angels, the Dickinson brothers formed b.l.o.w. with Richardson and the former No Sweat guitarist (turned vocalist) Dave Gooding. Jepson recorded and toured an album, Ignorance Is Bliss, under the moniker "Toby and the Whole Truth", which was intended to launch a solo career, but illness scuppered the tour and his immediate plans. He spent subsequent years away from the spotlight before a solo return in 2002.

When b.l.o.w. folded, Jimmy Dickinson became a member of the synth pop group Younger Younger 28's who had some success in Japan, and who released one album, Soap, on the V2 label. He gained his PhD in 2016 and Dr Jimmy is now the course leader for the Commercial Music course at BathSpa University, while working on developing new music projects.

Bruce John Dickinson went on to teach at, and manage, The Academy of Contemporary Music in Guildford, Surrey. He is now the managing director of the Brighton Institute of Modern Music which he set up with former Angels manager, Kevin Nixon.

Mark Richardson joined Skunk Anansie to replace their original drummer.  When that band folded, he joined Feeder, following the suicide of their original drummer Jon Lee. He remained with the band until the end of 2008 when he re-joined Skunk Anansie for a greatest hits tour and album, plus new material.

Mark Plunkett (bass) turned his hand to artist management, and went on to manage firstly Boyzone, then Ronan Keating.

Michael Lee worked as a jobbing drummer, often playing with Robert Plant.

After a long while away from the spotlight, Jepson struck out on his own in 2001, touring the "Refresh EP" in early 2002 and onwards. Financial pressures put the brakes on this solo venture, and it looked as though he would once again withdraw from the stage. However, he made a return as a solo artist supporting Thunder on their 2006 UK tour and has – once again – performed solo since then. A spot as guest vocalist for Gun, at a charity gig in Glasgow promoted by rockradio, on 8 January 2008 resulted in him taking the role permanently. This was confirmed in April 2008.

Jepson, Plunkett and the Dickinson brothers were reunited – supposedly for the first time since the band's split – at Michael Lee's funeral in December 2008.

Toby Jepson left GUN in June 2010 due to increased responsibility in other aspects of his musical involvement.

2012–2013: Reunion
It was announced in January 2012 that the band were reforming to perform at that year's Download Festival. Their newly launched website for the occasion credits the meeting of the four founding members at Michael Lee's funeral as the catalyst for this re-union, stating "From the tragic death of their band-mate old friendships are rekindled." In an interview with EverythingRock, guitarist Bruce Dickinson stated that he doubted the reunion would be a permanent one, although his answer was not definitive.

On 7 June, Little Angels played at the 2012 Sweden Rock Festival. The reunion culminated in a 9-date UK tour in December 2012 with venues including Nottingham Rock City and O2 Shepherd's Bush Empire. The Glasgow date had to be moved to a larger venue due to "phenomenal demand". Support came from fellow British band Skin.

Drummer Richardson could not perform on the tour due to commitments with Skunk Anansie, and was replaced by Dominic Greensmith (mainly known for his time with Reef). Similarly, Grant Kirkhope (trumpet) was unavailable. The reason given on stage by Jepson was that he was "living in California as a tramp".

Little Angels were booked to play the Isle of Wight Festival, supporting Bon Jovi, on 16 June 2013. On 9 May 2013 they issued a statement to say that this, in conjunction with warm up shows in Cardiff and Cambridge, would be the end of their reunion activities together. Drummer Richardson joined the band for these final three dates, but not trumpeter Grant Kirkhope.

Discography

Studio albums
 Don't Prey for Me (1989)
 Young Gods (1991) UK No. 17
 Jam (1993) UK No. 1
 Too Posh to Mosh, Too Good to Last! (1994) UK No. 18

Mini albums
 Too Posh to Mosh (1987)

Live albums
 Live at Hammersmith Odeon EP (1991)

Compilation albums
 A Little of the Past (1994) UK No. 20

Extended plays
 '87 (1987)
 Big Bad EP (1989) UK No. 74
 Big Bad World (1989)

Singles
 "90 in the Shade" (1988)
 "Do You Wanna Riot" (1989) UK No. 91
 "Don't Pray For Me" (1989) UK No. 93
 "Kicking up Dust" (1990) UK No. 46
 "Radical Your Lover" (1990) UK No. 34
 "She's a Little Angel" (1990) UK No. 21
 "Boneyard" (1991) UK No. 33
 "Product of the Working Class" (1991) UK No. 40
 "Young Gods" (1991) UK No. 34
 "I Ain't Gonna Cry" (1991) UK No. 26
 "First Cut Is the Deepest" (1992)
 "Too Much Too Young" (1992) UK No. 22
 "Womankind" (1993) UK No. 12
 "Soapbox" (1993) UK No. 33
 "Sail Away" (1993) UK No. 45
 "Ten Miles High" (1994) UK No. 18
 "All Roads Lead to You" (1994)

References

External links
Official Little Angels site
Official Toby Jepson site
The only b.l.o.w. site

English rock music groups
People from Scarborough, North Yorkshire
Music in Yorkshire